Gemcraft–Wittmer Building, also known as Gemcraft, was a historic commercial building located in downtown Evansville, Indiana. It was built in 1892, and was a Late Victorian style building. It has been demolished.

It was listed on the National Register of Historic Places in 1984.

References

Commercial buildings on the National Register of Historic Places in Indiana
Victorian architecture in Indiana
Commercial buildings completed in 1892
Buildings and structures in Evansville, Indiana
National Register of Historic Places in Evansville, Indiana